Laurence Anstice Pavitt (1 February 1914 – 14 December 1989) was a Labour and Co-operative Party politician in the United Kingdom.

Pavitt was a lifelong pacifist and a conscientious objector in the Second World War. He was secretary of the British Federation of Young Co-operators 1942-46 and general secretary of the Anglo-Chinese Development Society 1946–52.
 
He served as a councillor on the Municipal Borough of Ilford 1949-52 and was national organiser of the Medical Practitioners' Union 1956–59.

Pavitt was Labour Co-operative Member of Parliament for Willesden West from 1959 to 1974, and for Brent South from 1974 until he retired in 1987.  He was parliamentary private secretary to the Foreign Secretary from 1965, and was an Assistant government whip from 1974 to 1976.

Sources 
 Times Guide to the House of Commons, 1966, 1983 and 1987 editions

1914 births
1989 deaths
British conscientious objectors
British pacifists
Labour Co-operative MPs for English constituencies
Councillors in Greater London
UK MPs 1959–1964
UK MPs 1964–1966
UK MPs 1966–1970
UK MPs 1970–1974
UK MPs 1974
UK MPs 1974–1979
UK MPs 1979–1983
UK MPs 1983–1987